The women's high jump event at the 2015 European Athletics U23 Championships was held in Tallinn, Estonia, at Kadriorg Stadium on 10 and 12 July.

Medalists

Results

Final
12 July

Qualifications
10 July

Participation
According to an unofficial count, 26 athletes from 17 countries participated in the event.

References

High jump
High jump at the European Athletics U23 Championships